Captivity is a 2007 horror film of the "torture porn" subgenre, directed by Roland Joffé, written by Larry Cohen and Joseph Tura, and starring Elisha Cuthbert and Daniel Gillies. Considered an entry into a subgenre popularized by such film series as Hostel and Saw, the film centres on a young fashion model (Cuthbert) who is abducted and is psychologically tortured by unknown assailants.

Plot
Jennifer Tree is a rising fashion model. On an evening out alone, Jennifer is stalked and drugged. She wakes up in a cell containing personal items taken from her apartment. Jennifer is shown recordings of victims who were tortured in the same cell, as well as records of her interviews. She screams and pleads to be let go, but no one replies.

Jennifer is subjected to various forms of psychological torture. She then discovers that a young man, Gary Dexter, is being held captive in an adjoining cell. The two make contact and attempt to find an escape. They both make it to a garage containing a vehicle, but are knocked out by sleeping gas. Jennifer wakes up in her cell, and sees a recording of Gary being threatened in his cell. Afterwards, he is thrown into her cell. She rushes over to help him, and they proceed to have sex.

After Jennifer drinks a bottle of drugged water and falls asleep, Gary wakes up and leaves the cell. It is revealed Gary and his older brother, Ben, have Jennifer captive in their home; she is the latest of several women they have abducted to re-enact the tortures inflicted upon them as children by their mother. Gary joins Ben and tells him that he is falling in love with Jennifer, then stabs his brother. He watches recordings of him murdering their mother.

Gary is interrupted by two detectives looking for Ben. Despite Gary telling them his brother is not home, the two enter the house. After they accidentally see the surveillance video of Jennifer in her room, Gary shoots them both.

Gary goes back to Jennifer's cell and tells her that he has killed the perpetrators and they can leave. He places Jennifer in a room and tells her to stay there.  One of the detectives, having survived the gunshot wound, jumps out at her. Mistaking him for her captor, she kills him with a baseball bat. She then discovers the incriminating photos with Gary in them. Ben, who survived the stabbing, attacks her, and she kills him as well.

Jennifer searches through one of the detectives' pockets. Gary finds her and she says she will help him clean up the mess. When he lets down his guard, she sprays him with pepper spray and runs away, sabotaging the house's electrical system. Eventually, Jennifer successfully kills Gary. She uncovers a window leading outside and leaves.

Alternate ending 
The film's original ending, shown in its entirety on the DVD, depicted a man being captured and tortured with acid before being murdered with a hammer. Through press clippings, the man is shown to be a serial killer of women, and his assailant is revealed to be Jennifer, who has adapted her former captors' methods to become a vigilante who tortures and kills criminals. This ending was re-edited and used as a cold open in the final cut.

Cast

Re-editing 
After Dark Films founder and present head Courtney Solomon went back to edit the original concept of Captivity to add more gore and violence to please the American audience. In a statement, Solomon is believed to state that he felt the film was not gruesome enough for a mainstream "torture porn". He felt the change would bring in more money for the film, after noticing the success of Hostel; however, the film performed poorly at the box office. Solomon later released a statement saying, "It's overkill. I think audiences have said, 'I've had enough.' It's as simple as that."
The original version of Captivity was only released in Spain, Argentina and the United Kingdom.

Advertising controversy
Several controversial images depicting promotional scenes from the film were released by After Dark Films in Los Angeles and New York, where they were shown on billboards and taxicabs. The advertisement consisted of pictures involving the kidnapping, torture, and presumable murder of a female character. Offended witnesses soon filed complaints to After Dark, who claimed it had been an error and explained that the concept was only one of several working ideas that were being considered for marketing to the general public. According to executive producer Courtney Solomon, who spoke on behalf of After Dark, it was not supposed to have been approved; he followed by saying, "To be honest with you, I don't know where the confusion happened or who's responsible."

"This film was done in association with After Dark Films. The nature of the association allows After Dark autonomy over their marketing materials, and therefore we neither saw nor approved this billboard before it was posted," said Peter Wilkes, head of Lionsgate investor relations. "Once aware of the materials and the reaction to them, we immediately asked After Dark to remove the billboards, to which they immediately and cooperatively responded."

Joss Whedon has become the public face of a movement directed at the MPAA to remove the film's rating, in accordance with MPAA guidelines that state that any film that uses advertising that has not been approved by the MPAA (in this case, the advertising was specifically disapproved) will possibly forfeit their right to be rated. According to writer Joey Soloway, who runs the website Remove the Rating, Solomon himself was responsible for the ads in question, going over the design in extreme detail, and is thus being disingenuous in the above-cited quote. The MPAA issued a ruling dated 28 March 2007, which said that, as punishment, it would not consider rating the film until at least 30 April, making the release date of 18 May less likely (because releasing the film "unrated" would greatly impact its potential to sell tickets). The MPAA is also, in an unprecedented move, requiring that they approve the placement of all forthcoming advertisements for the film.

Release

Critical reception
Captivity opened on Friday, 13 July 2007. The film holds a 9% approval rating on Rotten Tomatoes based on 78 reviews.  The site's consensus reads: "Lacking scares or psychological insight, Captivity is a distasteful entry in the 'torture porn' subgenre." Online critic James Berardinelli gave it a zero star rating, stating that there is "nothing redeemable here. It's not tense or scary; it's just demented". Bloody-Disgusting.com named the film as the "worst horror film of 2007". Joe Leydon of Variety wrote that it will likely be remembered more for the billboard controversy than its plot, but it still generates "modest suspense after a predictable but effective plot twist".

Mark Kermode described the film as a 'Grotty, nasty, sleazy, infantile piece of dung'.

Elisha Cuthbert's performance was nominated for both a Teen Choice Award and a Razzie Award for Worst Actress. It also earned Razzie nominations for Worst Director and Worst Excuse for a Horror Movie but lost both to I Know Who Killed Me.

Box office
The film grossed $1,429,100 in its opening weekend, placing it at No. 12 at the US box office. By the end of its run, the film had grossed $10,921,200.

DVD
The DVD was released on 30 October 2007 with a widescreen unrated version and the original R-rated version. It includes a making-of featurette and an on-the-set look of the film. There was also a special two-disc edition, which had a metal keep case with fine sand on the front cover beneath a plastic layer depicting Cuthbert in relief print beneath it, just as in a scene from the film.

References

External links
 
 
 
 
 
 

2007 films
2007 horror films
2007 crime thriller films
2000s mystery thriller films
2000s horror thriller films
American crime thriller films
American horror thriller films
American independent films
American mystery thriller films
American serial killer films
Films scored by Marco Beltrami
Films about kidnapping
Films directed by Roland Joffé
Films shot in Moscow
Lionsgate films
Russian crime thriller films
Russian horror thriller films
Russian mystery thriller films
Torture in films
Canadian horror thriller films
Canadian independent films
Canadian crime thriller films
Canadian mystery thriller films
Films with screenplays by Larry Cohen
2000s English-language films
2000s American films
2000s Canadian films